The Ides of March is the second solo album by American singer and guitarist Myles Kennedy. It was released on May 14, 2021 via Napalm Records. In an interview with Kylie Olsson, Kennedy stated that he was listening to this record and told himself that he basically just made a "rock" record but only adding elements from his previous solo effort like acoustic guitar and lap steel guitar.

It was chosen by Loudwire as the 29th best rock/metal album of 2021.

Background
In an interview with Loudwire, Myles explained the meaning behind every track of the record and its story behind it. For the song "Get Along", it is basically about the 1992 Los Angeles riots and how the lyrics affected 2020. "A Thousand Words" is about his friend's father's mother and how she was standing in an old photograph. The song, "In Stride" is about a survivalist preparing for an impending zombie apocalypse. The title song, "The Ides of March" is about warning and a bleak outlook to remind us who we are. "Wake Me When It's Over" is about Myles' alcohol addiction during the pandemic and how he was very bored during lockdown. The song "Love Rain Down" is about a desire for answers and unity in the world. "Tell It Like It Is" is about speaking your mind when you've had enough. The song "Moonshot" is about the eager to go back on tour with his bandmates. For the song, "Wanderlust Begins" it is about the yearning to set out and start over from the beginning. "Sifting Through the Fire" is basically about getting the wrong information whether it's from the news or social media. The final song off the album, "Worried Mind" is about the assurance that someone is willing to remain steadfast for something while calling on the need to compromise.

Track listing

Personnel
 Myles Kennedy – vocals, guitar, banjo, lap steel, bass guitar, mandolin
 Zia Uddin – drums, percussion
 Tim Tournier – bass guitar
 Michael "Elvis" Baskette – keyboards, producer, mixing
 Jef Moll – engineering, digital editing
 Brad Blackwood - mastering

Charts

References

2021 albums
Myles Kennedy albums
Napalm Records albums
Albums produced by Michael Baskette